Thomas Coventre (died 1451), of Devizes, Wiltshire, was an English politician.

He was a Member (MP) of the Parliament of England for Devizes April 1414, November 1414 and 1425.

References

Year of birth missing
1451 deaths
English MPs April 1414
People from Devizes
English MPs November 1414
English MPs 1425